Matt Zone is a former Cleveland, Ohio city councilman. He is president of the National League of Cities. He is a member of the United States Democratic Party.

Zone was born in Cleveland, Ohio to Michael and Mary Zone, who were both prominent members of Cleveland City Council, and represented the same west side ward now represented by their son. His older sister, Peggy Fisher, is the wife of former Ohio Lieutenant Governor Lee Fisher. His younger sister, Melissa, is an activist and urban planner in Florida.  His cousin Joseph is a Cleveland Municipal Court judge.

References
Profile, cleveland.com; accessed March 18, 2017.

External links
Cleveland City Council biography, clevelandcitycouncil.org
City Council Profile, cleveland.com

Living people
Cleveland City Council members
21st-century American politicians
Ohio Democrats
Year of birth missing (living people)